Sam Stewart (born 10 April 1995 in New Zealand) is a New Zealand rugby union player who has played for Manawatu, Canterbury and Southland in the National Provincial Championship.  His 
primary playing position is hooker. 

His twin brother Jordan Stewart also played rugby for Southland.

In the 2022 season Sam played for Southland again and scored a try in their win over Counties-Manukau.

Reference list

External links
itsrugby.co.uk profile
 https://www.odt.co.nz/star-news/star-sport/star-rugby/canterbury-npc-squad-named-nine-new-players-included

Living people
1995 births
New Zealand rugby union players
Rugby union hookers
New Zealand twins
Twin sportspeople
Southland rugby union players
Manawatu rugby union players
Canterbury rugby union players
Rugby union players from Southland, New Zealand